Fukutomi Dam  is a gravity dam located in Hiroshima Prefecture in Japan. The dam is used for flood control and water supply. The catchment area of the dam is 53.8 km2. The dam impounds about 70  ha of land when full and can store 10900 thousand cubic meters of water. The construction of the dam was started on 1975 and completed in 2008.

References

Dams in Hiroshima Prefecture